Pope Gabriel I of Alexandria was the Coptic Pope of Alexandria and Patriarch of the See of St. Mark.

10th-century Coptic Orthodox popes of Alexandria